William Edward Charles Wootton Abney (7 January 1921 – 9 August 1997) played Reverend Copley on Coronation Street in 1977, and Jim Lorimer in 1980. His other television credits include The Adventures of William Tell, Crossroads, Special Branch, Play for Today, All Creatures Great and Small, Robin's Nest and The Return of Sherlock Holmes.

The son of Henry Charles Wootton Abney, of the landed gentry family of Abney of Measham Hall, Derbyshire, by his wife, Janet Bentley Littlejohn, Abney was educated at Cranleigh School and the Central School of Speech and Drama.

His stage work included West End roles in the original production of Carrington V.C. in 1953, and (as Giles Ralston) in Agatha Christie's The Mousetrap in 1956-1959.

As a film actor, Abney appeared in Horrors of the Black Museum (1959), Never Take Sweets from a Stranger (1960), Two-Way Stretch, (1960), Cone of Silence (1960), The City of the Dead (1960), Hitler: The Last Ten Days (1973), The Legacy (1979), North Sea Hijack (1980) and Curse of the Pink Panther (1983). 
	
As a writer, Abney wrote the story for "Poor Butterfly" (1969), an episode of Journey to the Unknown (TV series).

Filmography

References

External links

1921 births
1997 deaths
People educated at Cranleigh School
English male film actors
English male television actors
English television writers
People from Upminster
20th-century English male actors
British male television writers
20th-century English screenwriters